Aforia staminea is a species of sea snail, a marine gastropod mollusk in the family Cochlespiridae.

Description
The high, narrow, shell grows to a length of 35 mm. This thin shell is translucent white. It is biconically fusiform, scalar and carinated with spiral threads. The sculpture of the shell shows coarse, sinuous, irregular growth lines. Above the middle of each whorl, there is a strong carination that projects slightly. The body whorl shows a tendency to a second carination. The whole surface is covered with unequal and irregular threads as well as by somewhat broken microscopic lines.

(Original description) The high, narrow shell has a biconically fusiform shape. It is scalar, carinated, with spiral threads, thin, white. The axial sculpture on the shell is scored with coarse irregular sinuous lines of growth ; but there is no trace of any other longitudinal markings. The spiral sculpture shows above the middle of each whorl is a strong carination only slightly projecting, but marked by the angulation of the whorl and by the prominence of the thread on its crest. On the body whorl there is a tendency to a second carination, which runs into the aperture just below the junction of the outer lip, and is thus concealed on all the earlier whorls (it is evident that this inferior angulation is a feature which varies much in different individuals). Besides these, the whole surface, is covered with irregular and
unequal threads ; these are feeblest on the sloping shoulder below the suture : close below the upper keel and on the snout and its conical base they are fine. Of these, about 4 above and 2 below the lower keel are the strongest, but they all tend to subdivide themselves and the whole shell is scored by irregular and somewhat broken microscopic lines.

The colour of the shell is a translucent white under a thin, pale, greyish-yellow epidermis, which adheres closely, but is apt to rub through.

The spire is high, narrow, conical, and slopingly scalar in consequence of the drooping shoulder between the suture and the keel. The apex is more or less eroded in all the four specimens :it
consists of not more than 1 embryonic whorls, which are globose, smooth, and with the point a little obliquely pressed down. The spire consists of 8 whorls, rather short except the last, of regular increase, angulated above the middle. The shoulder between the suture and the keel is straight-lined. From the keel the whorls are slightly contracted to the inferior suture, and the profile-line here is scarcely convex. The body whorl is feebly tumid below the keel, and is drawn out from a produced conical base into a long, narrow, cylindrical, very slightly upturned snout, which projects on the right side of the base. The suture is a fine, sharp, slightly irregular line, well defined by the contraction of the whorl above and the straight line of the shoulder on the whorl below. The aperture is club-shaped, being oval above, and prolonged below into a long, but not very narrow siphonal canal, which is a little sinuous, and widens towards its end in consequence of the oblique cutting-away of the columellar lip. The outer lip, which is thin, sharp, and patulous, leaves the body at a right angle and advances quite straight to the keel, above which lies the deep, thin-lipped, U-shaped sinus, whose lower margin runs parallel to, but a little above, the carinal thread. From the keel the lip-edge advances with a long, free, forward curve and a sinuous double sweep, first convex and then concave, to the point of the snout, where the edge is prominent, rounded, and patulous. The columellar lip is almost hyaline, being cut into the substance of the body whorl, but not extending beyond the edge of the aperture. It is slightly concave above, straight in the middle, and very early and obliquely cut away in front, from which point, for the sixth of an inch, it advances to the extreme point of the shell as a delicate, thin, sharp lamina bordering the siphonal canal. The operculum seems to have been broken, probably in the attempt to extract it; but it is obviously small, thin, and pale yellow.

Distribution
This species is distributed in the Southern Indian Ocean and off the Kerguelen Islands and Prince Edward Island

References

 Gálvez, O. 1991. Nuevo registro de Aforia staminea (Watson, 1881) para las costas de Chile (Mollusca, Gastropoda, Turridae). Noticiario Mensual, Museo Nacional de Historia Natural 319: 8–11

staminea
Gastropods described in 1881